VECA Airlines (Vuelos Economicos de Centro America) was a Salvadoran airline owned by Sociedad Hasgar S.A. de C.V. It was established in early 2014 in San Salvador with a main hub at Monseñor Óscar Arnulfo Romero International Airport. 
By the end of 2014, ALBA Petróleos de El Salvador had bought all outstanding shares of its holding company. As of January 18, 2017 VECA airlines suspended operations due to financial problems.

History
The airline started operations on 28 November 2014 with regional services to major cities in Central America (San José, Managua and Guatemala City). VECA started its services with two Airbus A319s.

Destinations
VECA Airlines' main hub was in San Salvador at Monseñor Óscar Arnulfo Romero International Airport. For initial operations in November 2014, VECA operated to the following cities:

Fleet
Veca Airlines was operating the following aircraft at the time it suspended operations:

References

Defunct airlines of El Salvador
Airlines established in 2014
Airlines disestablished in 2017
2014 establishments in El Salvador